St Paul's Church is a Grade II* listed  parish church in the Church of England in West Drayton, Nottinghamshire.

History

The church dates from the 12th century.

It is in a joint benefice with 
St. Nicholas' Church, Askham
All Saints' Church, Babworth
St Martin's Church, Bole
Our Lady and St Peter's Church, Bothamsall
St John the Baptist Church, Clarborough
All Saints' Church, Eaton
St Giles' Church, Elkesley
St Peter's Church, Gamston
St. Helen's Church, Grove
St Peter's Church, Hayton
St Martin's Church, North Leverton
St Peter and St Paul's Church, North Wheatley
All Hallows' Church, Ordsall
St Martin's Church, Ranby
St Saviour's Church Retford
St Swithun's Church, East Retford
St Michael the Archangel's Church, Retford
All Saints' Church, South Leverton
St Peter and St Paul's Church, Sturton-le-Steeple
St Bartholomew's Church, Sutton-cum-Lound

Bells 
West Drayton church has two bells that can be swing chimed.

Group of Churches 
This church is part of the Elkesley Group. This includes the parishes of:
All Saints' and *St Peter, Eaton and Gamston
St Giles, Elkesley
St Paul, West Drayton
Our Lady & St Peter, Bothamsall

References

12th-century church buildings in England
Church of England church buildings in Nottinghamshire
Grade II* listed churches in Nottinghamshire
Bassetlaw District